Eberardo Pavesi (2 November 1883 – 11 November 1974) was an Italian professional road racing cyclist.

Pavesi was born in Colturano, province of Milan.

The highlight of his career was at the 1912 Giro d'Italia when he rode with the victorious Atala team, the General classification being contested by teams rather than by individual riders that year.

He was later a team director, having under him racers such as Gino Bartali. He died in Milan in 1974.

External links

1883 births
1974 deaths
Cyclists from the Metropolitan City of Milan
Italian male cyclists
Giro d'Italia winners